This is the discography of American rockabilly band Stray Cats.

Albums

Studio albums

Live albums

Compilation albums

Video albums

Singles

Notes

References

Discographies of American artists
Rock music group discographies